William Novak (born 1948) is a Canadian–American author who has co-written or ghostwritten numerous celebrity memoirs for people including Lee Iacocca, Nancy Reagan, and Magic Johnson. He is also the editor, with Moshe Waldoks, of The Big Book of Jewish Humor. He has also written several "private" books, which he described in a 2015 essay for 
The New York Times.

He is the father of actor and writer B. J. Novak and composer Jesse Novak. He is Jewish.

Books
 High Culture: Marijuana in the Lives of Americans. New York: Alfred A. Knopf, 1980, 
 The Great American Man Shortage and Other Roadblocks to Romance (and What to Do About It). New York: Rawson Associates, 1983, 
 Lee A. Iacocca with William Novak, Iacocca: An Autobiography. New York: Bantam Books, 1984, 
 Sydney Biddle Barrows with William Novak, Mayflower Madam: The Secret Life of Sydney Biddle Barrows, New York: Arbor House, 1986, 
 Herb Schmertz with William Novak. Good-Bye to the Low Profile: The Art of Creative Confrontation, Boston: Little, Brown, 1986, 
 Tip O'Neill with William Novak, Man of the House: The Life and Political Memoirs of Speaker Tip O'Neill, New York: Random House, 1987, 
 Nancy Reagan with William Novak, My Turn: The Memoirs of Nancy Reagan. New York: Random House, 1989, 
 Earvin "Magic" Johnson with William Novak, My Life, New York: Random House, 1992, 
 Oliver L. North with William Novak, Under Fire: An American Story, New York: HarperCollins, 
 Claire Sylvia with William Novak, A Change of Heart: A Memoir, Boston: Little, Brown, 1997, 
 An Incredible Dream: Ralph Roberts and the Story of Comcast. Philadelphia: Comcast Corporation, 2012, 
 Max Kargman with William Novak, The Education of Max Kargman, Boston: Foundation Books, 2003.
 Susan Whitman Helfgot with William Novak, The Match: Complete Strangers, A Miracle Face Transplant, Two Lives Transformed, New York: Simon & Schuster, 2010,

As editor
 William Novak and Moshe Waldoks, The Big Book of Jewish Humor. New York: Harper & Row, 1981, 
 William Novak and Moshe Waldoks with Donald Altschiller, The Big Book of New American Humor: The Best of the Past 25 Years. New York: HarperPerennial, 1990, 
 Die Laughing: Killer Jokes for Newly Old Folks, New York: Touchstone, 2016,

References

1948 births
American non-fiction writers
Jewish American writers
Ghostwriters
Living people
21st-century American Jews